The Twin Lakes are a pair of lakes connected by a channel in Nipissing District, Ontario, Canada, about  southeast of the village of Temagami. They are individually named Upper Twin Lake and Lower Twin Lake.

Hydrology
Monshan Island in Lower Twin Lake is the only named island of the Twin Lakes.

The primary outflow is an unnamed creek in the southwestern corner of Lower Twin Lake, which eventually flows via Rabbit Creek, Rabbit Lake, the Matabitchuan River, Lake Timiskaming and the Ottawa River into the Saint Lawrence River.

Transportation
The Ontario Northland Railway mainline runs along the entire western side of Lower Twin Lake and along the southeastern side of Upper Twin Lake; it crosses the narrows of the lakes on a bridge. A railway point named Doherty lies at the southwestern corner of Lower Twin Lake.

Geology
This mineral showing, known as the Upper Twin Lake Occurrence, is hosted in diabase of a Nipissing sill just north of a contact with pebbly greywackes and conglomerates of the Coleman Member of the Gowganda Formation. Sampling has indicated low silver and copper values with 50 parts per billion platinum and 30 parts per billion palladium.

See also
Lakes of Temagami

References

External links

Lakes of Temagami
Strathcona Township